The Sherman Historic District encompasses the historic town center of Sherman, Connecticut.  It covers an  historic district area centered on the junction of Connecticut Routes 37 and 39, and consists mostly of residential structures, some of them dating to not long after the town's incorporation in 1740.  Most of the village center was developed in the 19th century.  Notable buildings include the 1837 Greek Revival Center Church (now used as a performance space), the 1886 Old Town Hall, and the 1926 Colonial Revival library building.

The district was listed on the National Register of Historic Places in 1991.

See also
Sherman Historic District
National Register of Historic Places listings in Fairfield County, Connecticut

References

Federal architecture in Connecticut
Historic districts in Fairfield County, Connecticut
Sherman, Connecticut
National Register of Historic Places in Fairfield County, Connecticut
Historic districts on the National Register of Historic Places in Connecticut
Buildings and structures in Sherman, Connecticut